The Submerged Cathedral is a 2004 novel by Australian author Charlotte Wood.

Awards
Commonwealth Writers' Prize, South East Asia and South Pacific Region, Best Book, 2005: shortlisted 
Miles Franklin Literary Award, 2005: shortlisted

Reviews
"Open House" 
"The Weekend Australian" - Murray Waldren 
Miles Franklin longlist reviews

References

2004 Australian novels